Zhongli District is a district in Taoyuan City, Taiwan. Zhongli is spelled variously as Jungli, Jongli, Jhongli or Chungli on railway stations, bus stops and road signs. Historically, the city is the site of the Zhongli Incident of 1977, the most significant event of the democratization movement prior to the 1980s. Ethnically, it is considered a capital city for Hakka Taiwanese, who live in great numbers here and in surrounding areas; many elderly persons can speak Hakka in addition to Mandarin and Taiwanese Hokkien. In recent years many foreign workers (mainly from the Philippines and Thailand) have also settled in and around the city due to the heavy industry in the suburbs of the city, making it a center for foreign laborers. The district of Zhongli has three large parks and over 70 green reserves.

Zhongli District is the busiest district in Southern Taoyuan (南桃園), as well as the location of the Taoyuan HSR station.

History

Qing dynasty
In the 19th century, the area was home to Plains aborigines. During the Qing dynasty, immigrants from Fujian and Guangdong provinces arrived along with Hakka. The original name of the area was Kan-a-lek due to its location between Tamsui and Hsinchu.

Republic of China
After the handover of Taiwan from Japan to the Republic of China in 1945, Zhongli was reorganized as Zhongli Town. In October 1950, it was placed under Taoyuan County. On 1 July 1967, Zhongli was promoted to a county-administered city and became Zhongli City. On 25 December 2014, as Taoyuan County was upgraded to a special municipality named Taoyuan City, Zhongli became a district of the municipality.

Demographics
Zhongli's population was estimated at 425,604 in February 2023, including 8,417 Taiwanese aborigines. Zhongli is subdivided into 85 villages, with the eight biggest but least populated villages on the western side of the district (39 square kilometers but with 35,000 people), while the eastern side is occupied by industrial factories and the heart of the metropolitan area. This reflects the imbalance of development of western and eastern Zhongli.

Administrative divisions
The district comprises 88 villages: Chenggong (成功), Deyi (德義), Duxing (篤行), Fude (福德), Fuhua (復華), Fuxing (復興), Guangming (光明), Guoling (過嶺), Heping (和平), Houliao (後寮), Huaai (華愛), Huaxun (華勛), Jianxing (健行), Jinhua (金華), Jiuming (舊明), Linsen (林森), Longan (龍安), Longchang (龍昌), Longci (龍慈), Longde (龍德), Longgang (龍岡), Longping (龍平), Longdong (龍東), Longxing (龍興), Mingde (明德), Neicuo (內厝), Neiding (內定), Neili (內壢), Puqiang (普強), Puqing (普慶), Puren (普仁), Puyi (普義), Puzhong (普忠), Qiaxi (洽溪), Qingpu (青埔), Qingxi (青溪), Renai (仁愛), Rende (仁德), Renfu (仁福), Renhe (仁和), Renmei (仁美), Renxiang (仁祥), Renyi (仁義), Sanmin (三民), Shandong (山東), Shitou (石頭), Shuiwei (水尾), Dongxing (東興), Wenhua (文化), Wufu (五福), Wuquan (五權), Xingfu (幸福), Xingfu (興福), Xingguo (興國), Xinghe (興和), Xinghua (興華), Xingnan (興南), Xingping (興平), Xingren (興仁), Xinjie (新街), Xinming (新明), Xinxing (新興), Xinyi (信義), Yongfu (永福), Yongguang (永光), Yongxing (永興), Yuemei (月眉), Zhengyi (正義), Zhenxing (振興), Zhiba (芝芭), Zhishan (至善), Zhongfu (中福), Zhongjian (中堅), Zhongjian (中建), Zhongli (中壢), Zhongrong (中榮), Zhongshan (中山), Zhongxiao (忠孝), Zhongxing (中興), Zhongyang (中央), Zhongyi (忠義), Zhongyuan (中原), Zhongzheng (中正), Zhuangjing (莊敬), Ziqiang (自強), Zili (自立), Zixin (自信) and Zizhi (自治).

Economy

Department Store and Shops
Zhongli TRA Station is surrounded by shops on the street, and Zhongli also has a SOGO-branched department store. Zhongli Night Market opens daily, usually from 6 p.m. to 1 a.m. In addition, there are two shopping districts: Ta-tung (大同商圈) and Jung-ping (中平商圈), both within half an hour's walk from the Zhongli train station.

Industry
The Zhongli–Neili Industrial Park was established in December 1976. This is a combined multipurpose industrial park, controlled by Taiwan's Economic Bureau, with a total area of 433 sq. yards. There are currently 480 companies that have built either factories or offices here, belonging to electronic, metal, chemical, mechanical, food, textile and plastic manufacturers.

Education

Library
 Zhongli District Library, four floors of books, allowed to be borrowed for a month
 Neili Library
 Longgang Library

Universities
 National Central University
 Chung Yuan Christian University
 Yuan Ze University
 Chien Hsin University of Science and Technology
 Vanung University
 Nanya Institute of Technology
 Sheng-te Christian College

Academies and institutes
 Yuan Kwang Buddhist Academy
 Army Academy R.O.C.

Public high schools
 The Affiliated Jhongli Senior High School of National Central University
 National Neili Senior High School
 National Zhongli Commercial High School

Religious organizations 
Taoist and folk religion Temples
Ren Hai Temple 
San Jiao Zi Yun Temple
Ci Hui Temple

Buddhist Temples
Yuan Hua Yuan
Yong Ping Temple
Yuan Kuang Ch'an Monastery

Christian Churches
Taiwan Lutheran Zhongli Truth Church
Taiwan Presbyterian Church Chungli Church
Zhongli Church of Christ
Zhongli Christian Bible Church
Zhongli Catholic Sacred Heart Church

Mosque
Longgang Mosque

Tourist attractions

 Action Museum
 HeySong Beverage Museum
 Matsu New Village
 Laojie River
 Shengchi Pavilion
 Taiwan High Speed Rail Museum
 Taoyuan Public Library Longgang Branch
 Rakuten Taoyuan Baseball Stadium
 Zhongli Arts Hall
 Zhongli Night Market
 Zhongping Commercial District
 Zhongping Road Story House
 X PARK

Transportation

Railway
Zhongli is centered around the Zhongli railway station, the third-busiest railway station in Taiwan. In addition, there is also the Neili railway station and the under-construction Chungyuan railway station. The Taoyuan HSR station on the Taiwan High Speed Rail (THSR) is a 15-minute drive from central Zhongli. There are free shuttle buses from central Zhongli to the THSR station every 15–20 minutes. The Taoyuan Airport MRT has been open to the public since 2017. An extension of this MRT line from Huanbei Station (A21) to the TRA station is still under construction as of October 2022. Laojie River Station (A22) is expected to open in July 2023, while Zhongli Railway Station (A23) is expected to open in 2028. In addition, the Taiwan Railways Administration Zhongli Station provides conventional train connections to other Taiwanese cities.

Mass rapid transit 
A18 Taoyuan HSR station
A19 Taoyuan Sports Park metro station
A20 Xingnan metro station
A21 Huanbei metro station
A22 Laojie River metro station (2023)
A23 Zhongli railway station (2028)

Taiwan Railways 
Neili railway station
Chungyuan railway station (2030)
Zhongli railway station

Taiwan High Speed Rail 
Taoyuan HSR station

Roads

Zhongli is served by both National Highway No. 1 and Provincial Highway No. 66. The nationally owned E-Go freeway buses, near the Zhongli Station, are an inexpensive way of transport to other cities.

Sister Cities
 Gumi, Republic of Korea (since 1989)
 Enfield, Connecticut, United States

Notable natives

 Angela Chang, singer and actress
 Candy Chen, dancer, actress, host, singer and model
 Maggie Chiang, singer and songwriter
 Hu Chen-pu, Commandant of the ROC Army (2006–2007)
 Elva Hsiao, singer and actress
 Hsu Hsin-liang, Chairperson of Democratic Progressive Party (1996–1998)
 Huang Pei-jia, actress
 Wu Po-hsiung, Chairman of Kuomintang (2007–2009)
 Shih Szu, actress
 John Wu, Magistrate of Taoyuan County (2009–2014)
 Aska Yang, singer

See also
 Taoyuan City

References

External links 
 
  
 Taoyuan County Government's Cultural Affairs Bureau 
 Zhongli Industrial Park Service Center